Henry Cecil Sutton (26 September 1868 – 24 May 1936) was an English sailor who competed in the 1908 Summer Olympics representing Great Britain. He was a crew member of the British boat Cobweb, which won the gold medal in the 8 metre class.

References

External links
profile

1868 births
1936 deaths
English Olympic medallists
British male sailors (sport)
Sailors at the 1908 Summer Olympics – 8 Metre
Olympic sailors of Great Britain
Olympic gold medallists for Great Britain
Olympic medalists in sailing
Medalists at the 1908 Summer Olympics